Suat Kaya (born 15 April 1999) is a Turkish professional footballer who plays as a midfielder for TFF Second League club Çorum.

Career
A youth product of Osmanlıspor, Kaya made his professional debut in a 2-1 Süper Lig loss to Akhisarspor on 18 May 2018.

On 16 July 2022, Kaya joined TFF Second League club Çorum.

References

External links
 
 
 

1999 births
Living people
People from Hizan
Turkish footballers
Association football midfielders
Süper Lig players
TFF Second League players
MKE Ankaragücü footballers
Tarsus Idman Yurdu footballers
Ankaraspor footballers